Coleophora polemoniella is a moth of the family Coleophoridae. It is found in the United States, including Ohio.

The larvae feed on the leaves of Polemonium reptans. They create a tubular, bivalved silken case.

References

polemoniella
Moths of North America
Moths described in 1919